Created in 2001, NFL Showdown is an out-of-print collectible card game by Wizards of the Coast based on American football. Cards feature players from the 2001-2003 seasons. During gameplay the game uses a barcode reader which resolves play selection. The game has been out of print since 2003.

See also
MLB Showdown
NBA Showdown

Reviews
Pyramid

References

External links

Card games introduced in 2001
Collectible card games
Wizards of the Coast games